Foreign Exchange is a 1970 American action thriller drama spy television film originally aired on ABC and directed by Roy Ward Baker. Its teleplay, written by Jimmy Sangster, was based on his own 1968 novel of the same name. The film starred Robert Horton, Jill St. John, and Sebastian Cabot. It is a sequel to the television film The Spy Killer, which was released the previous year.

Plot
When a Russian agent is arrested in London, former spy turned private eye John Smith (Robert Horton) is contacted by British Intelligence boss Max (Sebastian Cabot) and asked to participate in a secret operation behind the Iron Curtain. When Smith refuses, his American girlfriend Mary (Jill St. John) is threatened with immediate deportation. Smith reluctantly complies, only to find himself back in the world of espionage in an exchange plot designed to undermine the Russian Secret Service.

Cast
 Robert Horton: John Smith
 Sebastian Cabot: Max
 Jill St. John: Mary Harper
 Dudley Foster: Leo
 Clive Graham: Johns
 George Roubicek: Karkov
 Eric Pohlmann: Borensko
 Eric Longworth: Boreman
 Eleanor Summerfield: Mrs. Roberts

References

External links
 

1970 television films
1970 films
Television sequel films
Action television films
American thriller television films
American drama television films
Spy television films
ABC Movie of the Week
Films directed by Roy Ward Baker
American thriller drama films
1970s spy films
Films with screenplays by Jimmy Sangster
Cold War spy films
Films produced by Jimmy Sangster
1970s English-language films
1970s American films